Tim Barringer is the Paul Mellon professor of the history of art at Yale University.

Selected publications
Opulence and Anxiety: Landscape Paintings from the Royal Academy. Kineton, Warwickshire: Compton Verney, 2007.
Men at Work: Art and Labour in Victorian Britain. New Haven: Yale University Press, 2006.
Art and the British Empire. Manchester: Manchester University Press, 2007. (edited with Geoff Quilley and Douglas Fordham)
Art and Emancipation in Jamaica: Isaac Mendes Belisario and his Worlds. New Haven: Yale University Press, 2007. (Edited with Gillian Forrester and Barbaro Martinez-Ruiz)
"Sonic Spectacles of Empire: The Audio-Visual Nexus, Delhi-London, 1911-12" in E. Edwards, et al., eds., Sensible Objects: Material Culture, the Senses, Colonialism, Museums. London: Berg, 2006.

Notes and references

External links 
Tim Barringer talking about the relationship between the work of musicians (especially Elgar) and landscape artists.

Yale University faculty
Alumni of the University of Cambridge
New York University Institute of Fine Arts alumni
Alumni of the University of Sussex
British expatriate academics in the United States
British art historians
Year of birth missing (living people)
Living people
Slade Professors of Fine Art (University of Cambridge)